Acyrophyllum is a genus of katydids, containing a single species, Acyrophyllum exiguum. The genus name is commonly misspelled as Acrophyllum.

References 

Pseudophyllinae
Tettigoniidae genera
Monotypic Orthoptera genera